The North Tarrytown Assembly was an automobile factory in North Tarrytown, New York now known as Sleepy Hollow, situated on the Hudson River. The  plant was in operation from 1896 to 1996. Originally opened by the Stanley Steam Car Company, the plant was acquired by Maxwell-Briscoe in 1903 from the Ingersoll-Rand Drill Company. In 1913 Maxwell-Briscoe was renamed Maxwell Automobile Company. Separate portions of the complex were acquired by Chevrolet in 1914 and 1915. At this time Chevrolet was an independent company and not yet part of General Motors. In 1918 Chevrolet was integrated into General Motors.

A range of General Motors products were assembled in Tarrytown over the years; most were Chevrolet products, starting with the Chevrolet Series 490. Its last vehicles produced were GM's second generation minivans. These were the Chevrolet Lumina APV, Pontiac TranSport, and Oldsmobile Silhouette, but sluggish sales spelled the end for GM's Tarrytown operations with its 2100 employees. It was closed at the end of June 1996 when production of minivans was moved to Doraville Assembly in Georgia. Metro-North Railroad's Hudson Line runs through the property, and some of the siding tracks that used to serve the factory have been taken over by Metro-North as overflow storage tracks for maintenance of way equipment.

The plant was a noted polluter of the Hudson River. The plant used about 1 million gallons of water per day, which was returned to the river as waste. The plant's industrial waste (primarily lead chromate and other painting, cleaning, and soldering chemicals) would be emptied directly into the river. Domestic waste would be processed through the village's sewage treatment plant. Around 1971, the village's Sewer and Water Superintendent assured that the pollution reports were exaggerated, and that he and other residents would swim by a beach nearby, however Dominick Pirone, an ecologist and former director of the Hudson River Fishermen's Association (now Riverkeeper) was quoted as saying: "You can tell what color cars they are painting on a given day by what color the river is."

The site today is now being developed, with the parcel west of the railroad becoming a mainly-residential Toll Brothers development named "Edge-on-Hudson" and the east parcel retained by the Village of Sleepy Hollow for a new Department of Public Works garage and other facilities for the public.

Models
Some of the models produced at the plant included:
1915-1922 Chevrolet Series 490
1923-1926 Chevrolet Superior (introduction of GM "A" platform)
1927 Chevrolet Series AA Capitol
1928 Chevrolet Series AB National
1929 Chevrolet Series AC International
1930 Chevrolet Series AD Universal
1931 Chevrolet Series AE Independence
1932 Chevrolet Series BA Confederate
1933 Chevrolet Eagle
1933-1942 Chevrolet Master
1941-1952 Chevrolet Deluxe
1953-1957 Chevrolet 150/Chevrolet 210/Chevrolet Fleetline/Chevrolet Townsman
1980-1983 Buick Skylark 
1980-1985 Chevrolet Citation 
1980-1984 Pontiac Phoenix 
1990-1996 Chevrolet Lumina APV
1990-1996 Pontiac Trans Sport
1990-1996 Oldsmobile Silhouette

See also
 Pollution of the Hudson River

References

General Motors factories
Former motor vehicle assembly plants
Motor vehicle assembly plants in New York (state)
Sleepy Hollow, New York
1896 establishments in New York (state)